The Force Traveller is a light commercial vehicle (LCV) made and distributed by Indian manufacturer Force Motors.

It is a licensed copy of the Mercedes TN/T1 (First Gen), originally having altered badging then having a new facelift that is completely different. The vents near the wind shield are still there but hidden in the facelift.

It was originally launched in 1987 as the Tempo Traveller, with the Tempo Excel launched in 1999 with a wider range of commercial bodies.

First generation

Derivatives 

There are different configurations for different uses including luxury van, minibus, school bus, ambulance, Quick Response Vehicle, and a pickup.

Other options include high roof / low roof versions, the short chassis / long chassis versions.

The Force Traveller is very popular among the transport line in India, due to its versatile nature of seating. It comes in various configurations.

Specification 
The Traveller is powered by a Mercedes-Benz derived 2.6-litre (2596 cc) FM 2.6 CR BS VI engine, with CNG and diesel options. The diesel unit produces  @ 2800 rpm and torque of  @ 1400 - 2400 rpm.

Earlier Tempo models were powered by the Mercedes-Benz OM616 engine, a 2.4-litre (2399 cc) 4-cylinder diesel engine producing  @ 4000 rpm and torque of  @ 2000 rpm.

Second generation

Force Motors
Vans
Trucks
Cars of India
Cars introduced in 1987

References